The Rus'–Byzantine War of 907 is associated in the Primary Chronicle with the name of Oleg of Novgorod. The chronicle implies that it was the most successful military operation of the Kievan Rus' against the Byzantine Empire. Paradoxically, Greek sources do not mention it at all.

Primary Chronicle 

The chronicle describes the raid of 907 in considerable detail. The memory of the campaign seems to have been transmitted orally among several generations of the Rus'. This may account for the abundance of colorful details that belong to folklore rather than to history. 

We are told that, at first, Byzantine envoys attempted to poison Oleg before he could approach Constantinople. The Rus' leader, renowned for his oracular powers, refused to drink from the poisoned cup. When his navy was within sight of Constantinople, he found the city gate closed and the entry into the Bosporus barred with iron chains. 

At this point, Oleg resorted to subterfuge: he effected a landing on the shore and had some 2,000 dugout boats (monoxyla) equipped with wheels. After his boats were thus transformed into vehicles, he led them to the walls of Constantinople and fixed his shield to the gates of the Imperial capital. 

The threat to Constantinople was ultimately relieved by peace negotiations which bore fruit in the Russo-Byzantine Treaty of 907. Pursuant to the treaty, the Byzantines paid a tribute of twelve grivnas for each Rus' boat.

Interpretations 

That Oleg's campaign is not fiction is clear from the authentic text of the peace treaty, which was incorporated into the chronicle. Current scholarship tends to explain the silence of Greek sources with regard to Oleg's campaign by the inaccurate chronology of the Primary Chronicle. Some assume that the raid actually took place in 904, when the Byzantines were at war with Leo of Tripoli. A more plausible conjecture has been advanced by Boris Rybakov and Lev Gumilev: the account of the campaign in fact refers to the Rus'-Byzantine War (860), erroneously described in Slavonic sources as a Kievan failure. 

Despite recurrent military conflicts, the relations between the Rus' and Byzantium seem to have been predominantly peaceful. The First Christianization of the Rus' was reported by Patriarch Photius in the 860s. In one of his letters, Patriarch Nicholas Mysticus threatened to unleash a Rus' invasion of Bulgaria. Historians infer from his account that the Byzantines were able to manipulate the Rus' of Oleg's time for their own political ends. 

Furthermore, substantial contingents of the Rus' joined the imperial service and took part in the Byzantine naval expeditions throughout the 10th century. A squadron of 700 Rus' mercenaries participated in the Crete expedition of 902. A unit of 415 Varangians was involved in the Italian expedition of 936. Thirteen years later, 629 Rus' troops sailed on nine vessels to accompany the Greeks in their expedition against the Emirate of Crete.

See also 
 Rus'–Byzantine Treaty (911)

References
Andrey Nikolayevich Sakharov. Дипломатия древней Руси: IX – первая половина X в. Moscow, 1980.
Analysis of Nestor's account of the expedition on www.textology.ru.

900s conflicts
907
Battles involving the Vikings
900s in the Byzantine Empire
907
10th century in Kievan Rus'
Amphibious operations